Elena Rudolfovna Leonova (born 12 July 1973) is a Russian former pair skater. Representing the Soviet Union with Gennadi Krasnitski, she won the 1987 NHK Trophy, the 1989 Skate Canada International, and two World Junior Championships (1986, 1987).

Personal life 
Leonova was born on 12 July 1973 in Moscow. She married her skating partner Andrei Khvalko, with whom she has two daughters.

Career 
As a young child, Leonova trained under Elena Loboda. Vladimir Zakharov became her coach when she switched from singles to pairs, in 1983.

Leonova's first skating partner was Gennadi Krasnitski. The pair won gold at the 1986 World Junior Championships, held in December 1985 in Sarajevo, Yugoslavia, and successfully defended their title at the 
1987 World Junior Championships, held in December 1986 in Kitchener, Ontario, Canada.

Leonova/Krasnitski won their first senior international title at the 1987 NHK Trophy. In their final season as a pair, 1989–1990, they received three gold medals — at the Skate Canada International, Nebelhorn Trophy, and Grand Prix International St. Gervais — and bronze at the Soviet Championships.

From 1990 to 1992, Leonova trained in Alexander Zaitsev's group. Skating with Sergey Petrovskiy, she placed fifth at the 1991 Skate America.

After Leonova ended her ISU competitive career, she toured with a show produced by Tatiana Tarasova. She teamed up with Andrei Khvalko in 1995. The pair competed at four World Professional Championships and won it twice, in 1999 and 2000.

Results

With Krasnitski

With Petrovskiy

With Khvalko

References

External links

Navigation

Living people
1973 births
Figure skaters from Moscow
Soviet female pair skaters
Russian female pair skaters
World Junior Figure Skating Championships medalists